André Filipe da Silva Carvalhas (born 7 March 1989) is a Portuguese professional footballer who plays as a winger.

Club career
Carvalhas was born in Lisbon. A product of S.L. Benfica's youth system, he was promoted to the first team for 2008–09. However, on 16 July 2008, he was loaned to Rio Ave F.C. also in the Primeira Liga, to gain more playing time and experience; unsettled, he finished the season with Segunda Liga club S.C. Olhanense also on loan, where he also appeared rarely.

For 2009–10, Carvalhas continued in the second division and on loan, arranging a contract with recently-promoted C.D. Fátima; in July 2010, it was extended for another campaign. On 13 February of the following year he scored a hat-trick against Varzim S.C. in a 4–0 away win, and was voted the league's Young Player of the Month in February 2011– his team could not however avoid relegation, as 16th and last.

Carvalhas joined C.D. Trofense on 8 August 2011, as a free agent. On 19 July of the following year he signed for another side in division two, Associação Naval 1º de Maio.

After one season in Figueira da Foz, Carvalhas moved to yet another club in the second tier, Moreirense FC. After contributing two goals in 971 minutes to help them win the championship and subsequently promote, he agreed to a two-year deal with C.D. Tondela.

On 24 May 2015, in the last minute of the away fixture against S.C. Freamunde, Carvalhas scored through a free kick to level the score at 1–1 and help Tondela reach the top flight for the first time in its history, as champions. After being released, he returned to Algarve to sign with Portimonense SC. He found the net on the opening day of the campaign, helping defeat FC Porto B away 2–1.

On 26 June 2016, Carvalhas returned to C.D. Cova da Piedade who now competed in the second division, 15 years after having represented the club in its youth teams. He then moved abroad for the first time at FC Zaria Bălți, finishing fifth in the Moldovan National Division and being eliminated from the UEFA Europa League qualifiers by Apollon Limassol FC; he criticised the working conditions that he had in Eastern Europe.

Carvalhas returned to Portugal on 13 January 2018, signing for two and a half years with second-tier C.F. União. In June, he cancelled his cancelled his contract with the Madeirans after their relegation.

In July 2018, Carvalhas rejoined Cova da Piedade on a two-year deal.

International career
A Portuguese youth international, Carvalhas was the youngest player ever to represent the national team. He scored three goals in the 2008 Torneio Internacional do Porto for the under-19s.

Across four levels, Carvalhas earned 39 caps and scored 16 goals.

Club statistics

Honours
Olhanense
Segunda Liga: 2008–09

Moreirense
Segunda Liga: 2013–14

Tondela
Segunda Liga: 2014–15

Individual
Segunda Liga Young Player of the Month: February 2011

References

External links

1989 births
Living people
Footballers from Lisbon
Portuguese footballers
Association football wingers
Primeira Liga players
Liga Portugal 2 players
S.L. Benfica footballers
Rio Ave F.C. players
S.C. Olhanense players
C.D. Fátima players
C.D. Trofense players
Associação Naval 1º de Maio players
Moreirense F.C. players
C.D. Tondela players
Portimonense S.C. players
C.D. Cova da Piedade players
C.F. União players
Académico de Viseu F.C. players
Moldovan Super Liga players
CSF Bălți players
Portugal youth international footballers
Portuguese expatriate footballers
Expatriate footballers in Moldova
Portuguese expatriate sportspeople in Moldova